Neelam Jaswant Singh (born 8 January 1971 in Farmana) is an Indian discus thrower.

Her personal best throw is 64.55 metres, achieved at the 2002 Asian Games in Busan.

During the 2005 World Championships she tested positive for the banned stimulant pemoline in an in-competition test.

In the year 1998, Neelam Jaswant Singh won the bronze medal at the Bangkok Asian Games. In the Kosanova International Athlete Meet held at Almaty (Kazakhstan), Neelam J. Singh has to her credit a gold medal performance. In August 2000, she also won a gold medal at the ATF that took place in Jakarta. But with a throw of 55.26 metres, she failed to make a mark in the Sydney Olympics. She has been married to her coach Jaswant Singh. Neelam is employed with the Railway Coach Factory in Kapurthala and was awarded by the Punjab Government in the year 1996. Recognizing her talent the Indian Government conferred her Arjuna Award in the year 1998.

See also
List of sportspeople sanctioned for doping offences

References

1971 births
Living people
Indian female discus throwers
20th-century Indian women
20th-century Indian people
Olympic athletes of India
Athletes (track and field) at the 2000 Summer Olympics
Athletes (track and field) at the 2004 Summer Olympics
Commonwealth Games silver medallists for India
Athletes (track and field) at the 2002 Commonwealth Games
Asian Games gold medalists for India
Asian Games bronze medalists for India
Asian Games medalists in athletics (track and field)
Athletes (track and field) at the 1998 Asian Games
Athletes (track and field) at the 2002 Asian Games
Recipients of the Arjuna Award
Doping cases in athletics
Indian sportspeople in doping cases
People from Rohtak district
Sportswomen from Haryana
Commonwealth Games medallists in athletics
Athletes from Haryana
Medalists at the 1998 Asian Games
Medalists at the 2002 Asian Games
Medallists at the 2002 Commonwealth Games